Bishop Ullathorne RC School was established in Coventry, England, in 1953 and in 2006 it was awarded specialist status as a Humanities College. The school is named after William Bernard Ullathorne (1806-1889), the first Roman Catholic Bishop of Birmingham.

Initially the school had three separate parts; a boys' secondary modern school, a girls' secondary modern school and a grammar school. In 1968 these formed the core of the current comprehensive school, each of the three separate parts being initially identified as the Lower School, the Middle School and the Upper School. The grammar school later became the home of the Coventry Centre for the Performing Arts before being sold to Bovis Homes who built a housing estate on the land.

The two remaining buildings were re-dubbed 'A Block' and 'B Block' after the sale of the grammar school and the previously empty space between them was built on to form a single building. This area is now a passage for staff and allows quick movement between the two structures, with students only being allowed access during heavy rainstorms or with special permission.

Academics
The school currently has approximately 970 pupils, and includes a sixth form college. 
Bishop Ullathorne School has a good academic record and in 2012-13 91% of GCSE students gained 5 A*-C passes. At A Level, 72% of students achieved 3 A-C passes in 2012-2013. Students come from a wide range of backgrounds as the school draws in Catholics from around the city. Around a third of students are eligible for free school meals and 17% learn English as a second language. It is consistently ranked within the top 10 schools in Coventry in local league tables.

Sport 
Although relatively small, the school has a rich history in sport,  football, gymnastics, cross country and rugby. The school has won many Coventry Schools cups in football as well as winning the West Midlands Schools Cup. 

In the past five years the school has been in The Coventry Evening Telegraph Cup final four times, winning it three times. A special win came in 2006 when it was the first final to be played at The Ricoh Arena, resulting in a 3-0 victory.

Rivals
Finham Park Secondary School and Bishop Ullathorne are in close proximity to one another. The main gates of Bishop Ullathorne RC School are off Leasowes Avenue at the bottom of Moat Avenue, off the Kenpas Highway (A45). Finham Park School, with main gains on Green Lane, is close by as the crow flies, but it is on the other side of the Coventry to Kenilworth railway line. The school gates of the two schools are 10–15 minutes walking distance apart, as there is no direct access across the railway line.

Feeder Primary Schools
All Souls', Chapelfields
Our Lady of The Assumption, Tile Hill
St Anne's, Willenhall
St John Vianney, Mount Nod
St Mary and St Benedict Catholic School, Hillfields
St Thomas More, Stivichall

Former pupils
 Andrew Campbell (academic), Computer scientist
 Cathy Cassidy - children's author 
 Mary Creagh - MP for Wakefield (Labour)
 Joel Fearon - Team GB Bobsleigh Team
 Theresa Griffin - former Member of the European Parliament for the North West of England (Labour)
 Gary McSheffrey - footballer
 Air Chief Marshal Sir Christopher Moran
 Adam Walker - Nuneaton Town F.C. player

References

Secondary schools in Coventry
Catholic secondary schools in the Archdiocese of Birmingham
Academies in Coventry